Robert Meikle may refer to:

 Robert Desmond Meikle (born 1923), Irish botanist
 Robert Greenshields Meikle, merchant and political figure in Quebec